The following is a list of compositions by Giovanni Bottesini (1821–1889). A new comprehensive catalogue can now be found on the Bottesini Urtext website bottesiniurtext.com/bottesini-s-catalogue

Operas
Colón en Cuba (Cristoforo Colombo) – Opera in one act. Spanish libretto by Ramón de Palma and Rafael María de Mendive. Tacón Theatre, Havana January 31, 1848 (1847?). No known score remains.
L'assedio di Firenze (1856)
Il diavolo della notte (1858)
Marion Delorme (1862)
Vinciguerra (il bandito) - Opéra-bouffe en un acte (1870)
Alì Babà (1871)
Ero e Leandro (1879)
La regina del Nepal (1880)
Nerina (1882)
Azaële o La figlia dell'angelo (never performed)
Cedar (never performed)
Babele (never performed)

Orchestral works
Symphony in D major (1836)
Arabian Nights (1878)
Alba sul Bosforo (1881 al Teatro San Carlo di Napoli)
Promenade des ombres
Sinfonia Caratteristica
Fantasia funebre "alla memoria del colonnello Nullo"
Graziella
Marcia Funebre
Marcia Orientale
Margherita
Ouverture
Divertimento per corno da caccia (bugle) and orchestra
Andante sostenuto, for string orchestra
Ero e Leandro, Prelude
Il diavolo della notte, Sinfonia
Ali Baba, Overture

Works for double bass

with piano
Adagio melanconico appassionato (Elegie par Ernst)
Gran Allegro di Concerto "à la Mendelssohn"
Allegretto-Capriccio in F-sharp minor ("à la Chopin")
Capriccio di bravura
Elegy No.1 in D major (1870)
Elegy No.2 in E minor, "Romanza drammatica"
Elegy No.3 in E minor, "Romanza patetica" (Melodia)
Rêverie (1870)
Tarantella in A minor
Fantasia Cerrito
Fantasia on Bellini's "Norma"
Fantasia on Bellini's "Beatrice di Tenda"
Fantasia on Bellini's "I Puritani" (1st version)
Fantasia on Bellini's "La Straniera"
Fantasia on Bellini's "La Sonnambula" (1849)
Gran Fantasia on Donizetti's "Lucia di Lammermoor"
Fantasia on Verdi's "Il Trovatore"
Introduzione e Gavotta in A major
Introduction et Variations sur Le Carnaval de Venise
Variations on Nel cor più non mi sento from Paisiello's La "Molinara"
Introduzione e Bolero
Introduzione e Fuga
Meditazione: Aria on G string from Suite BWV 1068 by J.S.Bach
Melodia No.1
Melodia No.2
Melodia No.3
Melodia No.4: Auld Robin Gray, Introduction and Variations on a Scottish Song
Serenata from Rossini's "Barber of Seville"
Aria from Verdi's "Il trovatore"
Una furtiva lacrima, Romanza on Donizetti's "L'Elisir d'amore"
Finale of Bellini's "La sonnambula"
Contrabass-Polka
Nocturne

with orchestra
Concerto No.1 "Concerto di bravura" in A major for double bass (1840)
Concerto No.2 in B minor for double bass (1853) (I. Allego moderato; II. Andante; III. Finale. Allegro quasi una polacca)
Concerto No.3 in F-sharp minor for double bass (1871) (I. Allego moderato; II. Andante; III. Finale. Allegro con fuoco) 
Concertino in C minor for double bass (I. Moderato: II. Andante; III. Finale) (version of Concerto No.2, for double bass and strings)
Concerto a Due Contrabbassi No.1 (Gran Duo Concertante) for 2 double basses and orchestra/piano (original version, 1880)
Gran Duo Concertante for violin, double bass and orchestra/piano (1846) (arranged by Bottesini for Violin + Double bass and later updated for its publication)
Gran Duo Concertante for clarinet in A, double bass and orchestra/piano
Concerto a Due Contrabbassi No.2 Passione Amorosa (I. Allegro deciso; II. Andante-Allegro; III. Allegretto), for double bass (or cello), 2nd double bass and orchestra/piano
Duo Concertant on Themes of Bellini's "I Puritani" for cello, double bass and orchestra (2nd version of Puritani Fantasy)
Duet for clarinet and double bass
Concerto in G major, for cello and double bass

duets
3 Grandi Duetti, for 2 double basses:
No.1 (I. Allegro; II. Andante; III. Polacca. Molto allegro)
No.2 (I. Allegro; II. Andante; III. Rondò. Allegretto)
No.3 (I. Andantino; II. Presto)
Duo in D major, for cello and double bass (I. Allegro; II. Andante molto; III. Allegro)
Capriccio, for 2 double basses and piano
3 Fantasie on Rossini's Canzonette, for 2 double basses and piano:
1. La danza: Allegro non troppo
2. La serenata: Andante
3. I marinai: Allegro moderato

Chamber music
String Quartet No.1 in B minor
String Quartet No.2 in B-flat major, Op.2
String Quartet No.3 in F-sharp minor
String Quartet No.4 in D major
String Quartet No.5 in E-flat major
String Quartet No.6 in E minor
Quintet No.1 in C minor "Gran Quintetto"
Quintet No.2 in E minor
Quintet No.3 in A major
Quintet No.4 in F major
Morceaux, for viola and piano
Rêverie, for viola and piano
Capriccio, for cello and piano
3 Melodies, for cello and piano
Rêverie, for cello and piano

Piano solo
Preludio
Fugue in A minor
3 Polke:
1. Arlecchino
2. Brighella
3. La Tremblante

Vocal
Il lamento della Ghisa (Le chagrin de Jeanne) in D major, for soprano and piano (1870)
Melodia: Giovinetto innamorato, for soprano and piano
Ci divide l'ocean, for soprano and piano
Romanza: Dove fuggiste mai, for soprano and piano
Romanza: Une bouche aimeé, for soprano, double bass and piano
Terzetto: Tutto che il mondo serra (transcription of Etude No.19 in C-sharp minor, Op.25/7 by Chopin) for soprano, double bass and piano

Sacred works
Messa di Requiem (1877/80)
Il Giardino degli Ulivi (Garden of Olivet), Oratorio for soprano, contralto, tenor, bass + mixed chorus (SATB), organ (1887)

Instrumental music not including the solo double bass
Morceaux – Viola and piano; autograph score, Naples
Rêverie – Viola and piano; autograph score, Naples
Capriccio – Cello and piano; autograph score, Milan August 25, 1863
Three melodies – Cello and piano; autograph score, Milan
Rêverie – Cello and piano; autograph score, Naples
Various string quartets
Various string quintets

 
Bottesini, Giovanni

de:Giovanni Bottesini#Werke (Auswahl)